Plymouth Township is one of the twenty-seven townships of Ashtabula County, Ohio, United States. The 2010 census found 1,981 people in the township.

Geography
Located in the northern part of the county, it borders the following townships:
Ashtabula Township - north
Kingsville Township - northeast
Sheffield Township - east
Denmark Township - southeast corner
Jefferson Township - south
Austinburg Township - southwest corner
Saybrook Township - west

No municipalities are located in Plymouth Township.

The unincorporated settlements of Plymouth and Plymouth Center are located near the center of the township.

Name and history
Statewide, the only other Plymouth Township is located in Richland County.

The first settlers in Plymouth Township arrived in 1805 and 1806.

Government
The township is governed by a three-member board of trustees, who are elected in November of odd-numbered years to a four-year term beginning on the following January 1. Two are elected in the year after the presidential election and one is elected in the year before it. There is also an elected township fiscal officer, who serves a four-year term beginning on April 1 of the year after the election, which is held in November of the year before the presidential election. Vacancies in the fiscal officership or on the board of trustees are filled by the remaining trustees.  Currently, the board is composed of chairman David Waldron and members Deborah Friedstrom and Kevin Presley.

References

External links
County website

Townships in Ashtabula County, Ohio
Townships in Ohio